Wes Jetton (born September 5, 1988) is an actor, best known for his performance as Robin on AMC's The Walking Dead: World Beyond. He has performed in a long list of film projects, including: The Walking Dead: World Beyond, The First Lady, Ozark, and The Resident.

Early life 
Jetton is an American actor born and raised in Atlanta, Georgia. Jetton attended Forsyth Central HS. Upon graduating high school, he moved to New York City where he received a BFA from New York University Tisch School of the Arts.

Career 
After graduating from Tisch School of the Arts at NYU with a BFA in Theatre. After graduation, Jettin performed off broadway in NYC. He was a part of the Fellowship Company at Williamstown Theatre Festival. After living in New York City for 10 years, he returned to his home city of Atlanta, Georgia at the time of the city's filming boom. He has performed in a long list of film projects, including: The Walking Dead: World Beyond, The First Lady, Ozark, and The Resident. Jetton co-owns a company in Atlanta called the Working Actor Group (TWAG) . TWAG provides resources for actors such as: classes, audition filming, headshots, and networking events within the Atlanta film community.

Sobriety 
Jetton is an active advocate for sobriety. After dealing with addiction issues in his youth, he is in active recovery and has been sober throughout the majority of his adult life.

Filmography

References
 https://www.wesjetton.com 
 https://www.imdb.com/name/nm4996050/
 https://deadline.com/2021/09/the-walking-dead-world-beyond-wes-jetton-sean-michael-gloria-bmf-1234830465/
 https://www.comingsoon.net/tv/news/1195483-the-walking-dead-world-beyond-season-2-wes-jetton
 https://www.spoilertv.com/2021/09/the-walking-dead-world-beyond-season-2_0934971875.html
 https://www.twagatl.com
 https://www.twagatl.com/whoweare

External links
 https://www.wesjetton.com 
 https://www.imdb.com/name/nm4996050/
 https://deadline.com/2021/09/the-walking-dead-world-beyond-wes-jetton-sean-michael-gloria-bmf-1234830465/
 https://www.comingsoon.net/tv/news/1195483-the-walking-dead-world-beyond-season-2-wes-jetton
 https://www.spoilertv.com/2021/09/the-walking-dead-world-beyond-season-2_0934971875.html
 https://www.twagatl.com
 https://www.twagatl.com/whoweare

1988 births
Living people
20th-century American male actors
21st-century American male actors
American male film actors
American male television actors
Male actors from New York City